Gerardo "Jerry" Laterza (born July 1, 1974) is an American former soccer player. He is the technical director of Newport Mesa Soccer Club. He was the first Paraguayan American to play football in Paraguay.

Career
Laterza graduated from Walnut High School where he was the 1990 and 1992 California Interscholastic Federation 1-A Player of the Year.  Laterza attended Southern Methodist University, playing on the men's soccer team in 1992.  On April 3, 1993, Laterza signed with the Los Angeles Salsa of the American Professional Soccer League.  In 1997, Laterza began the season with the Orange County Zodiac.  In July 1997, the Los Angeles Galaxy of Major League Soccer signed Laterza.  He played four games for the Galaxy in 1997, plus one game on loan to the Carolina Dynamo.  The Galaxy released him on April 1, 1998 during a pre-season roster reduction.  On April 10, 1998, Laterza signed with the Seattle Sounders of the USL A-League.  He played two games, then was released on April 22.  He then played for several clubs, including South China AA, and various teams in Hong Kong, China and Paraguay. While in Hong Kong, he was selected to play for Hong Kong League XI, featuring in one of the matches against Paraguay.

References

External links
 
 Legends FC: Jerry Laterzo
 Newport Mesa Profile 

1974 births
Living people
American soccer players
American expatriate soccer players
American expatriate sportspeople in Hong Kong
American expatriate sportspeople in China
American expatriate sportspeople in Paraguay
American Professional Soccer League players
North Carolina Fusion U23 players
Hong Kong First Division League players
Kitchee SC players
LA Galaxy players
Los Angeles Salsa players
Major League Soccer players
Orange County Blue Star players
Seattle Sounders (1994–2008) players
SMU Mustangs men's soccer players
South China AA players
Expatriate footballers in Hong Kong
Expatriate footballers in China
Expatriate footballers in Mexico
Expatriate footballers in Paraguay
American people of Paraguayan descent
American sportspeople of Paraguayan descent
Sportspeople of Paraguayan descent
C.D. Veracruz footballers
Cerro Porteño players
A-League (1995–2004) players
Soccer players from Los Angeles
Association football midfielders
Hong Kong League XI representative players